Martin Höllwarth (born 13 April 1974) is an Austrian former ski jumper.

Career
At the 1992 Winter Olympics in Albertville, he won three silver medals. At the 1998 Winter Olympics in Nagano, he won bronze in the team large hill competition. Höllwarth's biggest successes were at the FIS Nordic World Ski Championships where he earned six medals, including three golds (team normal hill in 2001 and 2005; team large hill in 2005) and three bronzes (individual normal hill in 2001; team large hill in 1999 and 2001).

On 4 February 2001, whilst returning from an event in Willingen, a car driven by Höllwarth was involved in an accident in which Austrian coach Alois Lipburger died. Höllwarth and another passenger, fellow ski jumper and countryman Andreas Widhölzl, escaped with minor injuries.

Höllwarth announced his retirement at the 2007/08 season.

World Cup

Standings

Wins

Ski jumping world record

References
 

1974 births
Living people
Austrian male ski jumpers
Olympic ski jumpers of Austria
Olympic silver medalists for Austria
Olympic bronze medalists for Austria
Ski jumpers at the 1992 Winter Olympics
Ski jumpers at the 1998 Winter Olympics
Ski jumpers at the 2002 Winter Olympics
Olympic medalists in ski jumping
FIS Nordic World Ski Championships medalists in ski jumping
Medalists at the 1998 Winter Olympics
Medalists at the 1992 Winter Olympics
World record setters in ski flying
People from Schwaz
Sportspeople from Tyrol (state)
20th-century Austrian people
21st-century Austrian people